Tochi Onyebuchi (born October 4, 1987) is a Nigerian American science fiction and fantasy writer and former civil rights lawyer. His novella, Riot Baby, received an Alex Award from the American Library Association and the World Fantasy Award in 2021. He is known for incorporating civil rights and Afrofuturism into his stories and novels.

Early life
Onyebuchi was born in Northampton, Massachusetts. His parents were Nigerian Igbo immigrants Elizabeth Ihuegbu and Nnamdi Onyebuchi, who was a restaurant manager. His first name means "praise God" in Igbo.

His family lived in New Britain, Connecticut, until 1998, when his father died at aged 39. His family then moved to Newington, Connecticut, to a mostly white neighborhood. He attended the Choate Rosemary Hall school in Wallingford, Connecticut.

He says, "Growing up as the son of Nigerian immigrants, I always felt like I was in a position where I didn't completely identify as an African-American; I can trace my family eight generations back, but I'm not fully Nigerian, because I was born in America. I operate in that sort of in-between space."

As a youth, Onyebuchi was an avid reader and was strongly influenced by X-Men comics, especially the character of Black Panther. While he appreciated works by black authors he was required to read in high school, such as Their Eyes Were Watching God, Invisible Man and Native Son, he preferred adventure and science fiction stories. His favorite book was the manga series Blade of the Immortal.

In high school, he studied abroad for a year in France, where he fell in love with Alexandre Dumas's The Count of Monte Cristo, and was inspired when he learned Dumas was of African ancestry. He wrote extensively growing up and attempted to sell his first novel in high school.

He attended Yale University, graduating with a degree in political science in 2009. While there, he was a member of the fraternity of St. Anthony Hall. During college, he spent a summer in Morocco learning Arabic.

He earned a Master of Fine Arts degree in screenwriting from New York University's Tisch School of the Arts. While getting his MFA, he worked as a digital media intern for Marvel Comics.

Onyebuchi also received a master's degree in Global Economic Law from Instituts d'études politiques in France. He then attended Columbia Law School, receiving a Juris Doctor degree in 2015. There, he "got woke" about the differences between the lives of white and black Americans.

Career
After law school, Onyebuchi was licensed with the New York Bar and began a career in civil rights law. He worked in the Civil Rights Bureau of the New York State Attorney General's Office and was also an investigator for New York City's Legal Aid Society where he assisted prisoners from Rikers Island. He said, "This brought me to the edge of burnout. I wanted to remain involved in those issues, but away from the constant grind. I realized I didn't have the stamina for it."

He worked at a high-tech firm as a domain expert from 2017 to 2019, using his two-hour daily commute on the train as time to write. In 2019, he left his job to devote his time to writing.

Novels and stories 
Onyebuchi began writing novels and submitting them to publishers when he was in high school. When his first sixteen novels were rejected, he decided to move on to a new project rather than to edit and resubmit. Because of this process, he had written seventeen novels in fifteen years. About a year after law, school, he signed a contract to write two young adult novels.

His first published novel, Beasts Made of Night, was written for young adult readers and is set in a mythical dystopian world inspired by Nigerian folklore. School Library Journal wrote, "Onyebuchi's world-building is strong, and the details leap off the page; readers will witness the poverty, smell the delicious food, and feel the physical pain of being a sin-eater." Time wrote, "This balancing act of thrill and inquiry promises to make the 33-year-old Onyebuchi a power player in the YA world in the years to come." Beast of Night won the 2018 Ilube Nommo Award for Best Speculative Fiction Novel by an African. He published a sequel, Crown of Thunder, in 2018.

He then wrote the War Girls young adult series which includes War Girls in 2019 and Rebel Sisters in 2020. The setting for War Girls is  Nigeria of 2172, but using historical events such as the Biafran War. School Library Journal wrote that War Girls was, "A bleak but compulsively readable story with high action and high drama in equal measure."

In 2020, he published Riot Baby, revolving around Kev, born during the 1992 Los Angeles riots and his sister who possesses telekinetic powers. Onyebuchi drew on his experience as a lawyer in setting much of the novel at Rikers Island in New York, where Kev is wrongfully incarcerated. His inspiration for the novel came from the deaths of Michael Brown, Eric Garner, and Trayvon Martin and the lack of indictments of the police officers who killed them. He says, ""I felt a rage born of impotence. At the same time, as a writer, I clung to this idea of writers as alchemists—that we can take pain and anger and rage and sorrow and turn it into a work of art that will alleviate this crippling sense of loneliness." Riot Baby won the Alex Award for young adult fiction from the American Library Association, the Ignyte Award for best novella, and the World Fantasy Award for best novella. Riot Baby was also a finalist for the 2021 Hugo Award for Best Novella.

In 2022, Onyebuchi's first adult science fiction novel, Goliath, was published by Tor Books. He started working on this novel before writing Beasts of Night. Goliath is set in the year 2050 when the wealthy have moved to space colonies, leaving the poor behind in the crumbling remains of Earth. Through his novel, Onyebuchi critiques income inequality, gentrification, and racism. Publishers Weekly wrote that it was "urgent, gorgeous work". It was selected as The New York Times Editors' Choice Pick and one of "5 Books Not to Miss" by USA Today, and was a nominee for Best Science Fiction Novel in the 2022 Dragon Awards.

His stories have appeared in several anthologies and Asimov's Science Fiction, Ideomancer, Lightspeed, Omenauna Magazine, and Uncanny Magazine.

Comics 
Onyebuchi's first comic was a Domino story for the anthology Marvel's Voices: Legacy. One reviewer noted, "Tochi Onyebuchi writes one of the most effective Domino stories ever..."

In 2021, Marvel announced Onyebuchi would write a new comics series titled Black Panther Legends focusing on the origin of the Black Panther with illustrations by Setor Fiadzigbey. A long-time fan of comics, Onyebuchi said his response to this project was, "Is this real? Is this really happening?" ...I still can't totally process that I am writing a Black Panther book for Marvel."

In 2022, Onyebuchi wrote a Captain America preview comic titled Captain America #0, alongside Collin Kelly and Jackson Lanzig, It was illustrated by Mattia De Iluis. He went on to write Captain America: Symbol of Truth, with art by R. B. Silva.

Video games 
In 2021, Onyebuchi was among the writers of Call Of Duty: Vanguard video game developed by Sledgehammer Games and published by Activision.

Awards and honors 
 2021 AABMC Literary Award – Riot Baby
 2021 Alex Award, American Library Association – Riot Baby
 2021  Ignyte Award, Community Award for Outstanding Efforts in Service of Inclusion and Equitable Practice in Genre – #PublishingPaidMe, with L. L. McKinney
 2021 Ignyte Award for Best in Creative Nonfiction – "I Have No Mouth, and I Must Scream"
 2021 Ignyte Award for Best Novella – Riot Baby 
 2021 World Fantasy Award for Best Novella – Riot Baby
 2020 New England Book Award for Fiction – Riot Baby 
 2018 Nommo Award for Best Novel – Beasts Made of Night, Razorbill, 2017

Nominations 

 2021 Hugo Award Finalist for Best Novella – Riot Baby
 2021 Ignyte Award Finalist for Best in Creative Nonfiction – "Fine Weather, Isn't It?" 
 2021 Locus Award Finalist for Best Novella – Riot Baby
 2021 NAACP Image Award Nominee for Outstanding Literary Work – Riot Baby
 2021 Nommo Award Nominee for Best Novella – Riot Baby
 2020 Ignyte Award Finalist for Best Novel  Young Adult – War Girls
 2020 Locus Award Finalist for Best Young Adult Novel – War Girls
 2020 Nebula Award Finalist for Best Novella – Riot Baby
 2020 Nommo Award Nominee for Best Novel – War Girls

Personal life

Onyebuchi resides in New Haven, Connecticut.

Published works

Novels and novellas 

 Riot Baby. Tor Books, 2020. 
 Goliath. Tor Books, 2022. 
 "A Righteous Man" (Trespass Collection #5), Amazon Original Stories, 2022.

Nonfiction 
 (S)kinfolk: Chimamanda Ngozi Adichie's Americanah. Fiction Advocate, 2021.

Young adult novels

Beasts Made of Night series 
 Beasts Made of Night. Razorbill, 2017. 
 Crown of Thunder. Razorbill, 2018.

War Girls series 
 War Girls. Razorbill, 2019. 
 Rebel Sisters. Razorbill, 2020.

Comics 
 Black Panther Legends, Marvel Comics, 2021. 
 Legends Black Panther Legends #1, Marvel Comics, 2021.
 Black Panther Legends #2, Marvel Comics, 2021.
 Black Panther Legends #3, Marvel Comics, 2022.
 Black Panther Legends #4, Marvel Comics, 2022.
 Marvel's Voices: Legacy volume 1. various authors. Marvel, February 1, 2022. 
 Captain America: Symbol of Truth #1, Marvel Comics, 2022.
 Captain America: Symbol of Truth #2, Marvel Comics, 2022.
 Captain America: Symbol of Truth #3, Marvel Comics, 2022.
 Captain America: Symbol of Truth #4, Marvel Comics, 2022.

Short stories in anthologies 

 "Still Life with Hammers, a Broom, and a Brick Stacker," Obsidian: Speculating Futures: Black Imagination & The Arts. Downstate Legacies, 2016. 
 "Samson and the Delilah's," Black Enough: Stories of Being Young & Black in America (ed. Ibi Zoboi), HarperCollins, 2019. 
 "The Hurt Pattern, Made to Order: Robots and Revolution," Solaris, 2020. 
 "Habibi," A Universe of Wishes: A We Need Diverse Books Anthology. Dhonielle Clayton, editor. Crown Books for Young Readers, 2020. 
 "How to Pay Reparations: A Documentary," Year's Best Science Fiction Volume 2. Jonathan Strahan, editor. Saga Press, 2021. 
 "How to Pay Reparations: A Documentary," The Best American Science Fiction and Fantasy 2021. Veronica Roth and John Joseph Adams, editors.  Mariner Books, 2021.

Short stories in magazines 

 "Dust to Dust," Panverse Three, Panverse Publishing, September 2011 and Lightspeed Magazine, June 2019.
 "Zen and the Art of an Android Beatdown, or Cecile Meets a Boxer: A Love Story," Ideomancer, 2014.
 "Place of Worship," Asmiov's Science Fiction, September 2014.
 "Screamers," Omenana, i#8, November 2016.
 "The Fifth Day," Uncanny Magazine, i#30, September/October 2019.
 "A Room of One's Own," Us in Flux, Arizona State University Center for Science and the Imagination, May 2020.
 "How to Pay Reparations: A Documentary," Slate, August 2020.
 "Presque Vue," Uncanny Magazine, #41, 2021.

Essays 
 "From Scalia and a White Supremacist, a Victory for Prisoners' Rights," The Common Law, November 2015.
 "Where Do Scalia's Come From?," Harvard Journal of African American Public Policy, 2016, p. 13-15.
 "From Harlem to Wakanda: on Luke Cage and Black Panther," Oxford University Press Blog, November 12, 2016.
 "Homecoming: How Afrofuturism Bridges the Past and the Present," Tor.com, February 27, 2018.
 "The Art of the Drug Deal: Kanye West, "Daytona," and the Exploitation of Addiction," RaceBaitr, June 21, 2018.
 "Homo Duplex," Uncanny Magazine, #24, September/October 2018.
 "invisible" Not Seeing Myself in Any of my High School Reading Changed Me More than You'd Think.," Slate, June 2019.
 "White Bears in Sugar Land: Juneteenth, Cages, and Afrofuturism," Tor.com, June 19, 2019.
 "Select Difficulty," Tor.com, August 26, 2019.
 "My Gift Was Memory: On Ta-Nehisi Coates's The Water Dancer," Tor.com, October 15, 2019.
 "30 Minutes Till Madness: Power and Male Derangement in The Wheel of Time," Tor.com, October 21, 2019.
 "'Where in your affidavit does it say you're Black?': Why Worldbuilding Can't Neglect Race," Tor.com, January 21, 2020.
 "Why War Stories Could Reinjure Those Affected," Oxford University Press Blog, April 8, 2020.
 "I Have No Mouth, and I Must Scream: The Duty of the Black Writer During Times of American Unrest," Tor.com, June 1, 2020.
 "Fine Weather, Isn't It?," Science Fiction and Fantasy Writers of America Bulletin #215, December 8, 2020.

References

External links 

1987 births
Living people
American people of Igbo descent
People from Northampton, Massachusetts
People from Newington, Connecticut
Choate Rosemary Hall alumni
Yale University alumni
St. Anthony Hall
Tisch School of the Arts alumni
Columbia Law School alumni
Instituts d'études politiques alumni
21st-century American lawyers
21st-century American male writers
21st-century American novelists
African-American lawyers
African-American novelists
Afrofuturist writers
American civil rights lawyers
American fantasy writers
American male novelists
Asimov's Science Fiction people
Novelists from Connecticut
Writers from New Britain, Connecticut
Nommo Award winners
Black speculative fiction authors